Hans-André Stamm (born 1958) is a German organist and freelance composer who lives in Leverkusen, near Cologne, in Germany.

Biography
Stamm was born in Leverkusen, Germany, in 1958. At the age of 7, he began study of the piano and pipe organ with Paul Wißkirchen, then organist at the Cathedral of Altenberg. At 11 years old, he began touring Europe as an organ virtuoso and recorded his first track at 13.

From 1973 to 1976 he studied organ at the Conservatoire Royal de Musique in Liège with Hubert Schoonbroodt. Later he studied Catholic church music and piano pedagogy at the Robert-Schumann-Hochschule Düsseldorf.

Stamm is renowned for his Bach interpretations and his two DVDs recordings of selected Bach organ works on the famous Trost organ in the year 2000 for Pioneer, which is one of the most popular Bach organ albums to be put to record. He is living in Leverkusen (near Cologne), Germany, as a freelance organ virtuoso and composer.

Compositions (selection) 

 stage works:
 Fairy tale opera The Star Child after Oscar Wilde, Libretto: Alexander Nitzberg.
 Fairy tale opera Peronnik and the treasure of the dark king after a breton grail tale, Libretto: Alexander Nitzberg.
 Fairy tale opera Die Zaubertruhe (The magical chest) Libretto: Alexander Nitzberg.
 choir works:
 Cantata Christ, the heavenly Phoenix for 4prt mixed choir, string orchestra (or piano), oboe and timpani ad lib.
Missa gioiosa for 3 or 4prt mixed choir or 3prt female or male choir
Kölner Pueri cantores Messe for 2-4prt mixed choir oder 3prt mixed choir
 Hymn Lobet Gott (Praise the Lord, Psalm 150) for 4prt mixed choir and organ, timpani ad lib.
 Instrumental works (with orchestra):
 Concerto for organ and string orchestra (+woodwinds and brass ad lib.)
 Celtic Concerto for piano and string orchestra
 Concertino for 2 violins, piano and string orchestra
 Instrumental works (chamber music ensembles):
 Works for two trumpets and organ
 Works for trumpet and organ
 Ten pieces for flute and organ (or piano)
 Eight pieces for flute and organ (or piano)
 Organ sound and flute magic Vol. I-III
 Works for violin and organ (or piano)
 Six pieces for saxophone and organ
 Little Jazz Suite or saxophone and organ (or piano)
 Two Suites for horn and organ
 Two suites for trombone and organ
 String quartet
 Salsamania for woodwind quintet
 Concertino for flute, violin and piano
 Suite für flute, viola (cello) and piano
 Eight lyrical pieces for flute and piano
 Works for organ solo:
 Organ worksVol. I-VI
 Four Suites for organ
 Three choral fantasies for organ
 Organ variations for Christmas time
 Arrangements for organ:
 J. S. Bach - Two organ pieces
 César Franck - Larghetto from the string quartet
 Felix Mendelssohn - Allegro Vivace from 5th symphony

External links 

 Website of Hans-André Stamm: Link
 Hans-André Stamm auf YouTube

German composers
German classical organists
German male organists
1958 births
Living people
Bach musicians
People from Leverkusen
21st-century conductors (music)
21st-century organists
Male classical organists